Le Bouregreg is a rapid transit system serving Rabat, the capital of Morocco, and the nearby city of Salé. it commenced construction in 2008. Start operations in 2012.

Stations 
 Temara
 Rabat-Agdal
 Rabat-Ville
 Salé-Ville
 Salé-Tabriquet
 Sidi Bouknadel

Map

External links
 Al Bidaoui Official website
 ONCF Official website

Transport in Rabat
Salé
Rapid transit in Morocco